The 1999 Kazakhstan Top Division was the eighth season of the Top Division, now called the Kazakhstan Premier League, the highest football league competition in Kazakhstan.

Teams
Following the conclusion of the previous season, Nasha Kompaniya, Bolat and Naryn were relegated, with Tobol, Access-Esil, Zhetysu, Sintez and Kairat being promoted in their place. Prior to the start of the season, Irtysh Pavlodar became Irtysh-Bastau, Astana became Zhenis Astana, Khimik became Akmola, Tomiris became Sintez and Vostok became Vostok Altyn.

Team overview

League table

Results

Statistics

Top scorers

References

Kazakhstan Premier League seasons
1
Kazakh
Kazakh